Bibile Divisional Secretariat is a  Divisional Secretariat  of Moneragala District, of Uva Province, Sri Lanka.

References
 Divisional Secretariats Portal

Divisional Secretariats of Moneragala District